Marguerite Moreno (born Lucie Marie Marguerite Monceau; 15 September 1871, Paris - 14 July 1948, Touzac, Lot) was a French stage and film actress.

On 12 September 1900, in England, she married the writer Marcel Schwob, whom she had met in 1895. In 1905 he died of pneumonia while Moreno was away on tour.

Selected filmography
 Vingt ans après (1922) - Anne d'Autriche
 L'emprise (1924) - Madame Dubreuil
 Captain Fracasse (1929) - Dame Léonarde
 A Hole in the Wall (1930) - Arthémise
 Cendrillon de Paris (1930) - La voyante
 Paramount on Parade (1930, French version only) - Mme Béchu, la concierge
 Chérie (1930) - Mrs. Falkner
 Paris la nuit (1930) - Madame Zouzou
 Dans une île perdue (1931) - Mme. Schomberg
 Alone (1931) - Eliane
 Let's Get Married (1931) - Madame Marchal
 Cinópolis (1931)
 À mi-chemin du ciel (1931) - Madame Elsie
 Lo mejor es reir (1931) - Bijou
 The Champion Cook (1932) - Mme. Dumorel
 Miche (1932) - Madame Sorbiet
 L'agence O-Kay (1932) - Ghislaine
 Cognasse (1932) - Nurse
 Mon cœur balance (1932) - Célestine
 The Porter from Maxim's (1933) - Mme. Pauphitat
 Rien que des mensonges (1933) - Mme. Leverdier
 La poule (1933) - Mme. Hilmont
 The Weaker Sex (1933) - La comtesse Polacchi
 To Be Loved (1933) - Marie-Josèphe des Espinettes
 Les Misérables (1934) - La Thénardier
 Primerose (1934) - Mme de Sermaize
 Casanova (1934) - Madame Morin
 Voilà Montmartre (1934)
 L'aristo (1934) - L'ex-comtesse
 The Queen of Biarritz (1934) - La mère
 Paris-Deauville (1934) - La duchesse de Latour Lupé
 Les dieux s'amusent (1935) - Junon
 Jim la houlette (1935) - La marquise de la Verriere
 Bourrachon (1935) - Céleste Bruneau
 La marraine de Charley (1936) - Lucie d'Alvadorez
 Excursion Train (1936) - Ernestine Biscoton
 Confessions of a Cheat (1936) - La Contesse Beauchamp du Bourg de Catinax - The Countess
 Girls of Paris (1936) - La baronne de Beaupoil
 Tout va très bien madame la marquise (1936) - La marquise de Ploevic
 Let's Make a Dream (1936) - Une invitée (prologue)
 Culprit (1937) - Mme Gaude
 My Aunts and I (1937) - Tante Adèle
 Gigolette (1937) - La marquise de Mauperthuis
 The Pearls of the Crown (1937) - Catherine de Medicis (1860) - L'impératrice Eugénie âgée (1914)
 The Ladies in the Green Hats (1937) - La comtesse Tomski (La Dame de Pique)
 Boulot aviateur (1937) - Cléôpartre de de Bérodie
 Harvest (Regain) (1937) - La Mamèche
 La fessée (1937) - Blanche de Saint-Alba
 Ces dames aux chapeaux verts (1937) - Telcide
 Quatre heures du matin (1938) - La Duchesse
 Les Femmes collantes (1938) - Madame Mourillon
 Barnabé (1938) - La marquise de Marengo
 L'accroche-coeur (1938) - La joueuse
 Mother Love (1938) - L'américaine sur le paquebot
 La route enchantée (1938) - La comtesse de Méricourt
 I Was an Adventuress (1938) - Tante Émilie
 Eusèbe député (1939) - Émilie Bonbonneau
 Behind the Facade (1939) - La sous-directrice
 Le château des quatre obèses (1939) - Mme Heurteaux - l'espionne
 Ma tante dictateur (1939) - La tante
 Girls in Distress (1939) - Madame Vuilliard
 Nine Bachelors (1939) - Consuelo Rodriguez
 Radio Surprises (1940) - Herself
 The Blue Danube (1940) - Maria, la cartomancienne
 Strange Suzy (1941) - La tante
 La prière aux étoiles (1941) - Madame Pedoska - la voyante de la Luna Park
 La sévillane (1943) - Pepa
 Secrets (1943) - Madame Auguste
 Le camion blanc (1943) - La veuve du roi
 Love Story (1943) - Madame de Bonafé
 The White Truck (1943) - La grand-mère
 La collection Ménard (1944) - La romancière
 Carmen (1944) - La gitane - La zingara
 The Misfortunes of Sophie (1946) - Mademoiselle
 The Idiot (1946) - La générale Elisabeth Prokovievna Epantchine
 A Lover's Return (1946) - Tante Jeanne
 Rendezvous in Paris (1947) - Honorine Leclercq
 Lawless Roads (1947) - Hélène
 Naughty Martine (1947) - Madame de Stakelberg
 The Fan (1947) - La dame de l'au-delà
 L'assassin est à l'écoute (1948) - Mémée Renaud (final film role)

Bibliography
 Benstock, Shari. Women of the Left Bank: Paris, 1900-1940. University of Texas Press, 1986

References

External links

Marguerite Moreno Papers. General Collection, Beinecke Rare Book and Manuscript Library, Yale University.

1871 births
1948 deaths
Deaths from pneumonia in France
French stage actresses
French film actresses
French silent film actresses
Actresses from Paris
Sociétaires of the Comédie-Française
20th-century French actresses
19th-century French actresses